The Old Way is a 2023 American Western film directed by Brett Donowho, from a screenplay by Carl W. Lucas, and starring Nicolas Cage as a retired gunman on a mission to find the outlaws who killed his wife.

The film was theatrically released by Saban Films on January 6, 2023, and received mixed reviews by critics.

Plot
In 1878 in the Montana Territory, gunfighter Colton Briggs is a member of an extrajudicial posse organized to arrest and hang the brother of Walter McAllister, a notorious bandit. Walter and his men try to foil the public execution, resulting in a shootout that leaves Colton and the younger McAllister as the only survivors. Colton assures Walter's brother that he won't kill him; his execution was merely a feint to force his brother out of hiding. Enraged, the younger McAllister tries to shoot Colton in the back. Without hesitation, Colton guns him down and calmly rides away as Walter's young nephew James watches.

Twenty years later, Colton is a changed man: under the influence of his wife Ruth, he has become a respectable, clean-living merchant with a general store and a small farm, raising a twelve-year-old daughter named Brooke. To Colton's dismay, Brooke is defiant and unruly; he notices that she is also emotionally withdrawn and unable to behave like "normal folk", traits that remind him of his former life. Four men ride up to Colton's farm one day; their leader identifies himself as James McAllister. His gang stabs Ruth to death before painting a taunting message with her blood on the wall and leaving.

Colton and Brooke return to find Franklin Jarret, the U.S. Marshal tracking the McAllister gang, waiting at the farm with several deputies. As Ruth is buried, Jarret reveals to Brooke that he and Colton were once close friends and that he's proud of Colton giving up his violent ways to raise a family. Before leaving, he urges his old friend not to act on any desire he may have to take revenge on James. Colton decides to do so anyway and tells Brooke that she'll accompany him. Dressing in his old gunfighter's clothes and armed with his old pistols, Colton burns his farm and house down before leaving with Brooke.

The pair eventually catch up to Jarret after ambushing a wounded deputy for his horse; James had set a trap for his pursuers, killing three and leaving the others too injured to continue. Colton and Brooke disarm the survivors and threaten to torture them unless Jarret talks. He finally admits that James is traveling to Santa Rosa, a town in southern Colorado, to recover a buried stash of pesos and flee across the border while the heat on him dies down. Colton informs Jarret that he will take a horse and warns him not to interfere with his vengeance or he'll kill him.

Reaching Santa Rosa, Colton tells Brooke to visit a local shopkeeper and question him as to James's whereabouts while he waits just outside of town. James isn't fooled and captures Brooke as she tries to leave. Anticipating more ambushes, Colton manages to kill five members of the McAllister gang using his experience and wits before the last remaining member comes out with a shotgun aimed at Brooke. James tells Colton that he has two choices: he can either kill him, at which point Brooke will die, or he can for himself.

Taking stock of his situation, Colton chooses to kill the second man as James puts a bullet through his chest. As James crows over his victory, Brooke picks up her father's gun (having learned to shoot during their travels) and avenges him by killing James. 

Later, Jarret rides in and agree with Brooke to tell everyone that Colton Briggs died a hero's death apprehending the criminals, in exchange he would keep McAllister gang's money. However, unknown to Jarret, most of the money had been transferred to a pair of saddle bags, which Brooke prepares to ride back home with as the film ends.

Cast
 Nicolas Cage as Colton Briggs
 Ryan Kiera Armstrong as Brooke Briggs
 Shiloh Fernandez as Boots 
 Noah Le Gros  as James McAllister
 Nick Searcy  as Marshal Jarret
 Abraham Benrubi as Big Mike
 Clint Howard  as Eustice
 Dean Armstrong as Clark
 Kerry Knuppe  as Ruth Briggs
 Adam Lazarre-White  as Greg
 Craig Branham  as Arnie
 Beau Linnell as Mark

Production
Filming occurred in Montana. In October 2021, the film's crew members complained about property key assistant and armorer Hannah Gutierrez-Reed's handling of firearms, including an incident in which she discharged a weapon without warning and caused lead actor Nicolas Cage to walk off set. Gutierrez-Reed would later work as armorer on the set of Rust, and be a principal character in the shooting incident that killed Halyna Hutchins and wounded director Joel Souza. In January 2022, Saban Films acquired the film's distribution rights.

Release
The Old Way was released by Saban Films in limited theaters on January 6, 2023 and on January 13, 2023 through video on demand. Lionsgate is releasing the film on Blu-ray Disc (plus digital), DVD, digital and on demand Feb. 21. Special features on Blu-ray and DVD include audio commentary by director Brett Donowho; audio commentary by composer Andrew Morgan Smith; a behind-the-scenes featurette; and scoring sessions.

Critical reception

References

External links
 

2023 Western (genre) films
2023 films
American Western (genre) films
Films shot in Montana
2020s English-language films
Films set in 1878